Two ships of the King Line were named King James.

, in service 1925–35, built by Harland and Wolff for King Line
, in service 1950–58

Ship names